Adam Sweeting is a British rock critic and writer.

Sweeting started writing in 1979 for publications such as Beat Instrumental, Trouser Press, Australian magazine RAM and NME. In 1980, he became a feature editor for Melody Maker and briefly collaborated with Sounds. In 1985, he stopped collaborating with Melody Maker to work for The Guardian and Q. Sweeting has interviewed musicians such as Kate Bush, Neil Young, Tom Waits and Joni Mitchell and has written over 800 articles for The Guardian, including hundreds of obituaries. Since the 2000s, he has also published articles and interviews in The Times, The Independent on Sunday, and 
The Telegraph.

Sweeting signed as a partner for VTVC, a TV production company that developed programs broadcast on Channel 4. He is also the author of several books, including  Simple Minds published on Sidgwick & Jackson in 1999, and Cover Versions – Singing Other People's Songs published on Pimlico in 2004.

References

British music critics
British music journalists
Living people
Year of birth missing (living people)